Dallan Hayden (born June 22, 2003) is an American football running back for the Ohio State Buckeyes.

High school career
Hayden attended Christian Brothers High School in Memphis, Tennessee. Over his junior and senior seasons, he rushed for 4,012 yards and 57 touchdowns combined and was named Tennessee's Mr. Football both years. He committed to Ohio State University to play college football.

College career
As a true freshman at Ohio State in 2022, Hayden earned playing time alongside TreVeyon Henderson and Miyan Williams.

Personal life
His father, Aaron Hayden, played in the National Football League (NFL).

References

External links
Ohio State Buckeyes bio

Living people
Players of American football from Memphis, Tennessee
American football running backs
Ohio State Buckeyes football players
Year of birth missing (living people)